Třešť is a town in Jihlava District in the Vysočina Region of the Czech Republic. It has about 5,600 inhabitants. The historic town centre is well preserved and is protected by law as an urban monument zone.

Administrative parts
Villages of Buková, Čenkov and Salavice are administrative parts of Třešť.

Geography
It lies in the Křižanov Highlands. The peak of Špičák and its surroundings are protected as a national nature reserve. The Třešťský Stream flows through the town. The territory is rich in fish ponds.

History

The first written mention is from 1349, when the Church of Saint Martin was documented. Třešť was originally a small parish village on the crossroads of two trade routes. Since its establishment, the Jewish community has been in Třešť. 

Třešť was known for crafts and in the 19th century for its industry. The production of furniture and matches was established and textile and engineering industry flourish. The industrial boom was the work of Jewish entrepreneurs. The Jewish community declined in the first half of the 20th century, and disappeared as a result of the Holocaust.

Until 1901, Třešť was the largest market town in Moravia. In 1901, it was promoted to a town.

Demographics

Economy
Since 1931, the textile company Vývoj has been operating in the town. Uniforms for the papal Swiss Guard are made by this company.

Sights

The Church of Saint Martin was founded in the 13th century and is the oldest monument in the town. Its current appearance is result of Baroque reconstructions.

The Church of Saint Catherine of Siena was founded in the 16th century as a Lutheran church. After it was damaged by fire, it was renewed in 1842.

Třešť Castle was created by reconstruction of a fortress from 1513. It has a  large English style park. Nowadays it serves as a hotel.

The Jewish community is commemorated by the Empire style building of former synagogue from 1824, by Jewish cemetery founded in the early 18th century, and by Monument to the Jewish Victims.

Notable people
Joseph Schumpeter (1883–1950), Austrian political economist
Jaroslav Rošický (1884–1942), army officer
Otto Šimánek (1925–1992), actor

Twin towns – sister cities

Třešť is twinned with:
 Obergünzburg, Germany

Třešť also has friendly relations with Raabs an der Thaya in Austria.

References

External links

Třešť in the Jewish Encyclopedia

Cities and towns in the Czech Republic
Populated places in Jihlava District